The Grand Prix Museum is a motor racing museum in Sé, Macau, China.

History
The museum was inaugurated at the 40th Macau Grand Prix on 18 November 1993. The museum underwent renovation for the 50th celebration of the Macau Grand Prix.

The museum closed on 1 July 2017 for refurbishment. The refurbishment project was presented by the government in 2016 and had its public tender launched at the beginning of 2017. At the time, the government had an estimated budget of MOP380 million, dedicated to renovation and reorganization of the internal sewage network. The latest budget for the works had been increased to MOP830 million, the revised budget will also include the additional costs of purchasing all necessary equipment for the new museum to operate.

The museum re-opened on 1 June 2021.

Entry fees 
Prior to the 2017 renovations, entry into the Grand Prix Museum was free. Following the museum's 2021 re-opening, visitors aged between 12 and 65 year are charged 80 patacas, Macau residents receive 50% off the standard fee, paying only 40 patacas, and local children, senior citizens and other disadvantaged parties can enter for free. On specific holidays, the museum will provide discounted rates to visitors.

See also 
 Macau Grand Prix
 Donington Grand Prix Exhibition, United Kingdom
 List of museums in Macau

References 

Museums established in 1993
Museums in Macau
Auto racing museums and halls of fame
Macau Grand Prix
Transport in Macau
1993 establishments in Macau